EGV may refer to:

Eagle River Union Airport (IATA code EGV)
Elk Grove Village, Illinois, a municipality in the Chicago metropolitan area
Entertain Golden Village, Thailand's first cineplex operator now owned by Major Cineplex